Place Versailles is a shopping mall located at the corner of Sherbrooke Street East and Highway 25 in the Mercier–Hochelaga-Maisonneuve borough of Montreal, Quebec, Canada. Its anchors are Canadian Tire, Maxi, Winners/HomeSense and Bureau en Gros.

Most of the mall is one storey high, but a section of the mall, which was added in the 1980s, has two floors. Place Versailles is situated next to the Radisson metro station and is less than 2 km south of the Galeries d'Anjou mall.

History
The mall opened in November 1963 and included Steinberg, Miracle Mart, Greenberg and some other 30 stores and services.  Place Versailles was the first indoor shopping mall to be built in the Montreal area. Although there were already shopping centres in Montreal that had been covered on their sidewalks, Place Versailles was the first mall to be fully enclosed. Today, the original section of Place Versailles can be recognized as the corridor of Canadian Tire and Maxi.

On March 15, 1973, the Hudson's Bay Company opened a The Bay department store of 134,500 square feet.

From 1973 to 1987, Place Versailles was anchored by The Bay, Miracle Mart, Steinberg and Pascal's.

Miracle Mart at Place Versailles was rebranded under the M brand name on August 19, 1987; one of the last stores in Montreal to transition to the new nameplate.

In the late 1980s, Place Versailles expanded again and a new section was built with two floors, instead of one floor as in the rest of the mall.

On May 16, 1991, the Pascal's hardware chain went bankrupt. The store at Place Versailles closed at the end of July 1991. Except for three other locations, the vast majority of the Pascal's chain had already shuttered by the time the Place Versailles store closed. Rona - Le Quincailler and Fabricville both took the space during the first half of 1992, the latter opening specifically on May 13. A SAQ store and other small tenants also took the former space of Pascal.

Following the bankruptcy and liquidation of the M retain chain in early July 1992, the Place Versailles store was closed on August 29, 1992. Mirroring what had happened to Pascal's a year before, the M store at Place Versailles was among the last four locations to close chainwide. Also in 1992, Steinberg was converted to Maxi.

From 1993 to 2003, it was anchored by The Bay, Zellers, Maxi, and Rona- Le Quincailler.

In October 1996, Consumers Distributing went bankrupt  and the Distribution aux Consommateurs' store was replaced by Le Monde des Athlètes, now occupied by Ardene who also took the space of the Rivoli restaurant at the right.

Hudson's Bay Company closed its The Bay store at Place Versailles during the last quarter of 2003. The Bay's anchor space has since been dismantled by Winners/Homesense, Globo, Style Exchange (today Urban Depot), Safari, Sports Experts, Dollarama and McDonald's.

Rona closed in 2005 and Bureau en Gros took its space a year later.

Popular Quebec sports-themed restaurant chain La Cage aux Sports (later renamed La Cage – Brasserie sportive) opened its 50th restaurant in history at the mall in 2010, on the mall’s second floor. The restaurant can also be accessed from the outside of the mall via an elevator connecting the parking lot to the restaurant. The first sporting events shown at the restaurant were an NHL hockey game between the Montreal Canadiens and the Ottawa Senators, followed by the martial arts event UFC 121, whose main card was highlighted with a clash between Brock Lesnar and Cain Velasquez. During the 2015 FIFA Women’s World Cup tournament in which Canada was the host nation, the La Cage of the mall was featured on Fox Sports’ Garbage Time with Katie Nolan as a popular sports bar for U.S. soccer fans.

Zellers closed its doors in 2012 and was replaced by Target on September 17, 2013. Target did not want the former Zellers entrance that connected directly to Place Versailles' food court and, as a result, it was replaced by a graphic water fountain that the mall claims on its website to be the first in North America. Target closed in 2015 and lease sold to Canadian Tire in May 2015.

2017 Santa Claus incident 
In 2017, the mall faced criticism for promoting their Santa Claus' arrival to be on November 11, which is when Remembrance Day is observed in Canada. Furthermore, their Santa would be arriving at 10 a.m., one hour before the 11 a.m. Remembrance Day ceremonies would take place in Ottawa. Local veterans were quick to shun the mall for their decision, claiming that it showed a "lack of respect" towards Canadian veterans, especially given that 2017 marked the 100th anniversary of the Battle of Passchendaele, a key battle that took place during World War I. Requests were made for the mall to reschedule Santa's arrival, with some also asking to delay his arrival until once the ceremonies have concluded, but the mall kept his arrival date and time unchanged. Their Santa Claus was scheduled to make his entrance via helicopter and due to logistical concerns beyond the mall's control, his arrival could not be rescheduled to a different day. The mall did however try to make amends to the veterans over this issue in a Facebook post that has since been deleted and apologized for their decision.

See also
 Galeries d'Anjou
 List of largest shopping malls in Canada
 List of shopping malls in Montreal

References

External links
 

Shopping malls established in 1963
Shopping malls in Montreal
Mercier–Hochelaga-Maisonneuve